United Nations Security Council Resolution 255, adopted on June 19, 1968, after a large number of states began to subscribe to the Treaty on the Non-Proliferation of Nuclear Weapons the Council recognized that aggression with nuclear weapons or the threat of it against a non-nuclear-weapon state would create a situation in which the Security Council, and above all its nuclear-weapon State members would have to act immediately in accordance with their obligations under the UN Charter.

The Council also welcomed the intention expressed by certain States that they will provide or support immediate assistance to a non-nuclear-weapon state party to the treaty that is a victim of an act or the object of the threat in which nuclear weapons are used and reaffirmed that inherent right of individual and collective self-defense.

The resolution passed with 10 votes to none; Algeria, Brazil, France, India and Pakistan abstained.

See also
List of United Nations Security Council Resolutions 201 to 300 (1965–1971)
Nuclear proliferation
United Nations Security Council Resolution 984 (1995)

References 
Text of the Resolution at undocs.org

External links
 

 0255
Nuclear weapons policy
 0255
June 1968 events